Saint-Germain-Source-Seine was a former commune in the Côte-d'Or department in eastern France. On 1 January 2009, Saint-Germain-Source-Seine was merged with Blessey to form the new commune of Source-Seine. Its population was 28 in 2006.

Demographics

See also
Communes of the Côte-d'Or department

References

Saintgermainsourceseine
Populated places disestablished in 2009